Modern equipment of the French Army is a list of equipment currently in service with the French Army. Figures are provided by the Ministry of Armed Forces for 2021.

Personal equipment

Uniforms

Optronic devices and observation systems

Special equipment

Infantry equipment

Pistols

Assault rifles

Bayonet

Sniper and anti-materiel rifles

Submachine guns

Machine guns

Shotguns

Grenade launchers

Portable anti-material weapons

Vehicles

Armoured vehicles

Artillery and air defence

Engineering

Logistics

Unarmoured vehicles

Aircraft

References

External links
Official website of the French Ministry of Defense 
Les hélicoptères de l'armée de terre : situation et perspectives – Report from the French Senate 
Le rôle des drones dans les armées – Report from the French Senate 
Projet de loi de finances pour 2003 : Forces terrestres – Report from the French Senate 
Projet de loi de finances pour 2007 : Défense – Forces terrestres – Report from the French Senate 

French Army
Military equipment of France
Fra
Equipment